Alexander Zverev was the defending champion, but he lost in the second round to Daniel Brands.

Seeds

Draw

Finals

Top half

Bottom half

External links
 Main Draw
 Qualifying Draw

Sparkassen Open - Singles
2015 Singles